is a passenger railway station located in Kawasaki-ku, Kawasaki, Kanagawa Prefecture, Japan, operated by the private railway company Keikyū.

Lines
Minatochō Station is served by the Keikyū Daishi Line and is located 2.1 kilometers from the terminus of the line at Keikyū Kawasaki  Station.

Station layout
Minatochō Station has two opposed side platforms connected by a footbridge.

Platforms

History
Minatochō Station opened on 21 March 1932 as a temporary stop on the Keihin Electric Railway. It was the predecessor to the current Keihin Electric Express Railway. Initially it was located  further away from Keikyū Kawasaki Station than the present location. It renamed to its present name on February 1, 1944. On October 18, 1956, the station was moved to its present address. In April 1977, the former level crossing was eliminated by the completion of an overpass.

Keikyū introduced station numbering to its stations on 21 October 2010; Minatochō Station was assigned station number KK21.

Passenger statistics
In fiscal 2019, the station was used by an average of 7,963 passengers daily. 

The passenger figures for previous years are as shown below.

Surrounding area
 Japan National Route 409
Kawasaki Racecourse
Kawasaki City Asahicho Elementary School
Kawasaki City Minatocho Park

See also
 List of railway stations in Japan

References

External links

 

Railway stations in Kanagawa Prefecture
Railway stations in Japan opened in 1932
Keikyū Daishi Line
Railway stations in Kawasaki, Kanagawa